Gene Smith (born December 31, 1963) is an American football executive who served as the general manager of the Jacksonville Jaguars of the National Football League (NFL) from 2009 to 2012.

Early life and college
Smith was born in Willard, Ohio. He attended Heidelberg College, serving as a captain of the football team while playing as a defensive lineman.

From 1986 to 1988, Smith worked at Ohio University as a graduate assistant and later served as an assistant coach. He worked at Edinboro University from 1989 to 1994, serving as an assistant coach, recruiting coordinator, and strength and conditioning coordinator.

NFL career
Smith joined the Jaguars in 1994 as a college scout. He was promoted to director of college scouting in 2000, and then took on the role of Executive Director of College and Pro Personnel in January 2008. He became the first general manager in Jaguars history on January 12, 2009, after the resignation of James "Shack" Harris, who had been the team's vice-president of player personnel.

Smith was fired on December 31, 2012. following a 2–14 season which was the worst record in team history.

References

1963 births
Living people
American football defensive linemen
Edinboro Fighting Scots football coaches
Heidelberg Student Princes football players
Jacksonville Jaguars executives
Ohio Bobcats football coaches
National Football League general managers
People from Willard, Ohio
American football scouts
Players of American football from Ohio
Coaches of American football from Ohio